Angelopsis is a genus of hydrozoans belonging to the family Rhodaliidae.

The species of this genus are found in Northern America.

Species:

Angelopsis euryale 
Angelopsis globosa

References

Rhodaliidae
Hydrozoan genera